Selma DeBakey (3 December 1915 – 6 March 2013) was a Lebanese-American professor of scientific communication at Baylor College of Medicine who improved the field of medical writing and editing by designing and teaching courses to help doctors improve their academic writing and provide clear and concise medical information to patients. Selma worked closely with two of her siblings at Baylor College of Medicine, sister Lois DeBakey, a professor of scientific communication, and brother Michael DeBakey, a cardiovascular surgeon.

Early life and education 
Raised in Lake Charles, Louisiana, by her parents Shaker and Raheeja DeBakey, DeBakey was one of five children with siblings Michael, Lois, Ernest, and Selena. The DeBakey children excelled educationally with both Michael and Ernest becoming surgeons and Selma and Lois earning advanced degrees and becoming college professors.

DeBakey attended Tulane's Sophie Newcomb College where she earned her bachelor's degree in English with honors in languages and took postgraduate courses in languages and philosophy. While taking graduate courses Selma started helping her brother Michael edit his medical research papers as he prepared them for publication, a foreshadowing to her career in medical communication.

Career 
In 1941 DeBakey headed the editorial department at the Alton Ochsner Foundation and in 1944 she became director of the Department of Medical Communication at the Ochsner Clinic Foundation, a hospital system in Louisiana.  DeBakey served as a medical writer and guest editor for numerous medical journals and became the founding editor of the Cardiovascular Center Bulletin.

Along with her sister Lois, DeBakey created the first communication course approved for medical school curriculum in 1962. DeBakey sisters were recruited in 1968 by Baylor College of Medicine and moved to Houston, Texas where they taught courses and symposiums on medical communication. The medical communication lectures focused on teaching doctors to avoid medical jargon and improve the quality of medical writing through things like avoiding passive voice.

Baylor College of Medicine has a DeBakey Scholarship Fund in Medical Humanities created in honor of Selma, Lois, and Michael DeBakey.

References 

Baylor College of Medicine faculty
American women scientists
1915 births
2013 deaths
American people of Lebanese descent
Tulane University alumni
Academic journal editors
Scientists from Louisiana
21st-century American scientists
20th-century American scientists
People from Lake Charles, Louisiana
Women in medicine
American medical academics
Science communicators
American medical writers
American women academics
Information scientists
20th-century American women scientists
21st-century American women scientists